The 1907 West Down by-election was held on 6 September 1907.  The by-election was held due to the resignation of the incumbent Irish Unionist MP, Harry Liddell.  It was won by the Irish Unionist candidate Arthur Hill.

References

1907 elections in the United Kingdom
By-elections to the Parliament of the United Kingdom in County Down constituencies
20th century in County Down
1907 elections in Ireland